Agnen is an evil spirit in Amazonian Tupinambá mythology. He plays a role in the myth of the Twins, devouring one before being beaten by the other.

References

Demons
Deities and spirits
Tupí legendary creatures
Amazon mythology
Brazilian mythology